Code of Honor is a 2016 American action thriller film written, produced, edited, and directed by Michael Winnick. The film stars Steven Seagal and Craig Sheffer and was released to video on demand on May 6, 2016.

Plot
Colonel Robert Sikes is a stealthy, one-man assault team who takes on a city's street gangs, mobsters and politicians until his mission is complete. His former protégé, William Porter, teams up with the local police department to bring his former commander to justice and prevent him from further vigilantism.

Cast

Production
Writer-director Michael Winnik said he wanted to make "First Blood meets Death Wish." Seagal liked the script and an earlier film of Winnik's, Guns, Girls And Gambling and agreed to make the film.

The film was shot in Utah in March 2015 on a budget of $8 million. The shooting schedule was 20 days.

Winnik said of Seagal, "he's definitely the real deal... he really knows his guns, his Aikido, his martial arts, his fighting skills. You know, he's teaching you weapons, he's teaching you moves. He’s been around a long time, but his arms, his hands, they’re still lightning fast."

In the movie, Seagal's character dies. Winnik says the actor was not pleased with this and "if you ask him, he didn't [die]. He escaped. That said, the implication, the way the film is structured, is that he does. Obviously you can interpret it as you wish, but yes, he does go down. And that’s kind of what he’s been saying throughout the film. 'Would you give your life to save the world if no one knew you did it?' is the question he keeps posing. He's completed his mission and he's even made the other character take the fall for it."

Reception
The film received negative reviews from critics. In a review for the Los Angeles Times, Robert Abele called it "dreadful" and "laughably awful". Frank Scheck wrote in The Hollywood Reporter that the film includes almost every B-action cliché, and stated that "the latest effort from the bloated, aging star is... as bland as its title."

References

External links

2016 films
2016 action thriller films
2016 crime drama films
American action thriller films
American crime drama films
Films shot in Salt Lake City
2010s English-language films
2010s American films